Bullock County is a county of the U.S. state of Alabama. As of the 2020 census, the population was 10,357. Union Springs was chosen as the county seat in 1867, and presently is the county's only incorporated city. The county was named for Confederate Army Colonel Edward C. Bullock who was a state senator and outspoken secessionist who died during the American Civil War.

A National Center for Education Statistics report released in January 2009 showed that Bullock County had the highest illiteracy rate in Alabama at 34 percent.

History
Bullock County was established by act of the state legislature dated December 5, 1866, with areas partitioned from Macon, Pike, Montgomery, and Barbour counties. The boundaries were changed in February 1867.

Prior to the arrival of white settlers, the future Bullock County was inhabited by Creek Indians. The Treaty of Fort Jackson (1814) ceded much of Alabama and Georgia to the US government, and the Creeks were removed completely after 1830. From 1818 through the 1830s, white settlers poured into the area, turning the rich soil into cotton-producing plantations and the area into one of the state's richest.

Bullock County was devastated by the Civil War. Its once-enslaved population (about seventy percent of the total population) had sustained its output, but their emancipation caused a sharp decline in the economy. In the aftermath, Bullock County elected two former slaves to the state legislature, but with end of Reconstruction, the black population were severely restricted and kept down.

By 1877 the boll weevil had migrated into Bullock County cotton fields from Mexico, and the area's economy was further depressed. A significant portion of the once-cotton-producing area was converted to a site of the Amateur Field Trial competition for bird dogs and a game preserve.

Geography
Prior to white settlement, the future Bullock County terrain was completely wooded. It still bears a significant coverage of trees, with the remainder having been cleared for agricultural or urban usage. A range of hills, called Chunnenugga Ridge, bisects the county running east to west. It forms the watershed for the Tallapoosa River on the north, and streams on the south that flow to the Gulf of Mexico, including the Conecuh River, which flows through the extreme west end of Florida to reach the Gulf.

Adjacent counties

 Macon County - north
 Russell County - northeast
 Barbour County - southeast
 Pike County - southwest
 Montgomery County - west

Major highways

  U.S. Highway 29
  U.S. Highway 82
  State Route 51
  State Route 110
  State Route 197
  State Route 239

Airport
 Franklin Field - county-owned public-use airport, 5.2 miles/8.4 km WNW from Union Springs.

Communities

City
 Union Springs (county seat)

Town
 Midway

Census-designated place
 Fitzpatrick

Unincorporated communities

 Aberfoil
 Blues Old Stand
 Corinth
 High Ridge
 Inverness
 Perote
 Scottland
 Smut Eye
 Thompson

Ghost town
 Suspension

Demographics

2020 census

As of the 2020 United States census, there were 10,357 people, 3,521 households, and 2,504 families residing in the county.

2010 census
As of the 2010 United States census, there were 10,914 people in the county. 70.2% were Black or African American, 23.0% White, 0.4% Pacific Islander, 0.2% Native American, 0.2% Asian, 5.2% of some other race and 0.8% of two or more races. 7.1% were Hispanic or Latino (of any race).

2000 census
As of the 2000 United States census, there were 11,714 people, 3,986 households, and 2,730 families in the county. The population density was 19 people per square mile (7/km2). There were 4,727 housing units at an average density of 8 per square mile (3/km2). The racial makeup of the county was 73.11% Black or African American, 25.25% White, 0.38% Native American, 0.18% Asian, 0.02% Pacific Islander, 0.37% from other races, and 0.70% from two or more races. 2.75% of the population were Hispanic or Latino of any race.

There were 3,986 households, out of which 33.50% had children under the age of 18 living with them, 35.50% were married couples living together, 28.20% had a female householder with no husband present, and 31.50% were non-families. 28.90% of all households were made up of individuals, and 12.30% had someone living alone who was 65 years of age or older. The average household size was 2.56 and the average family size was 3.13.

The county population contained 26.10% under the age of 18, 10.30% from 18 to 24, 29.30% from 25 to 44, 21.20% from 45 to 64, and 13.20% who were 65 years of age or older. The median age was 35 years. For every 100 females there were 110.20 males. For every 100 females age 18 and over, there were 113.40 males.

The median income for a household in the county was $20,605, and the median income for a family was $23,990. Males had a median income of $22,560 versus $19,069 for females. The per capita income for the county was $10,163. About 29.80% of families and 33.50% of the population were below the poverty line, including 44.70% of those under age 18 and 29.10% of those age 65 or over.

Education 
Bullock County contains one public school district. There are approximately 1,400 students in public PK-12 schools in Bullock County.

Districts 
School districts include:

 Bullock County School District

Government and infrastructure
Bullock County is powerfully Democratic. It was one of only six Wallace counties to vote for George McGovern against Richard Nixon's 3,000-plus-county landslide of 1972 and it was only one of nine counties to back Goldwater and McGovern, all of which are located in the Deep South.

Alabama Department of Corrections operates the Bullock Correctional Facility in an unincorporated area in the county.

Climate

See also

 National Register of Historic Places listings in Bullock County, Alabama
 Properties on the Alabama Register of Landmarks and Heritage in Bullock County, Alabama

References

Notes

External links
 Barbour / Bullock County Drug Task Force Webpage
 Alabama State Archives
 Markers from Alabama State Archives
 Owen, Thomas McAdory. History of Alabama and Dictionary of Alabama Biography. Chicago: S.J. Clarke Publishing Co., 1921.

 

 
1866 establishments in Alabama
Populated places established in 1866
Black Belt (U.S. region)
Majority-minority counties in Alabama